Rytigynia eickii is a species of plant in the family Rubiaceae. It is found in Kenya and Tanzania.

Sources 

Vanguerieae
Vulnerable plants
Flora of Kenya
Flora of Tanzania
Taxonomy articles created by Polbot